George Richards may refer to:

Sportspeople
George Richards (English footballer) (1880–1959), English international footballer who played for Derby County
George Richards (Southern League footballer) (active 1911–1913), English footballer for Bristol Rovers
George Richards (Welsh footballer) (1874–1944), Shrewsbury Town F.C. and Wales international footballer
George E. Richards (1921–1992), American tennis player
George Richards (cricketer) (born 1807), English cricketer
George Richards (Australian footballer) (1888–1928), Australian rules footballer

Other
George Richards (Attorney General), Attorney General of Trinidad and Tobago, 1962–1967
George Richards (Australian politician) (1865–1915), Australian politician
George Richards (priest) (1767–1837), English Anglican priest and poet
George Richards (Marine Corps) (1872–1948), American military
George Richards (Warren County, NY) (active 1847–1855), American politician from New York
George Richards (British Army officer) (1898–1978), British general
George A. Richards (1889–1951), American radio station and sports team owner
George F. Richards (1861–1950), American religious leader
George Henry Richards (1819–1896), British sea captain
George Jacob Richards (1891–1984), American general
George Maxwell Richards (1931–2017), President of Trinidad and Tobago
George Mather Richards (1880–1958), American illustrator and painter

See also
Georges Richard (1863–1922), Frenchman who ran an automobile manufacturing firm 
Richards (surname)